Cycnogeton alcockiae, also known as southern water-ribbons, Alcock's water-ribbons or dwarf water-ribbons, is a plant in the arrowgrass family native to south-eastern Australia, where it has been recorded from South Australia, Tasmania and Victoria.  It is found in freshwater and brackish wetland communities, in pools, swamps and the margins of streams, where it grows to about 20 cm in height.  The fruit is a papery capsule.

The species was first described as Triglochin alcockiae by Helen Aston in 1993, with the species epithet honouring a Mrs Kath Alcock of Narracoorte. in 2010, the species was transferred to the genus, Cycnogeton.

References

Juncaginaceae
Flora of South Australia
Flora of Tasmania
Flora of Victoria (Australia)
Plants described in 1993